Bloom Junction is an unincorporated community in Scioto County, in the U.S. state of Ohio.

History
A variant name was Bloom Switch. A post office called Bloom Switch was established in 1870, and remained in operation until 1918. Besides the post office, the community had the Bloom Baptist Church.

References

Unincorporated communities in Scioto County, Ohio
Unincorporated communities in Ohio